Oleh Romanovych Khrustavka (born 20 April 1998) is a Ukrainian professional footballer who plays as a right-back for Ukrainian club Nyva Ternopil.

References

External links
 
 

1998 births
Living people
People from Chortkiv
Ukrainian footballers
Association football defenders
FC Krystal Chortkiv players
FC Nyva Ternopil players
Ukrainian First League players
Ukrainian Second League players
Ukrainian Amateur Football Championship players
Ukrainian expatriate footballers
Sportspeople from Ternopil Oblast